Ralph Modjeski (born Rudolf Modrzejewski; January 27, 1861 – June 26, 1940) was a Polish-American civil engineer who achieved prominence as "America's greatest bridge builder."

Life
He was born in Bochnia, in Galicia, on January 27, 1861, to Gustav Sinnmayer Modrzejewski and actress Helena Opid Modrzejewska (best known outside Poland as Helena Modjeska). In 1865, his mother left Sinnmayer, and in 1868, she married "Count" Karol Bożenta Chłapowski. In July 1876, they emigrated to America, where, as a matter of convenience, the boy's mother changed her name to Helena Modjeska and her son's name to Ralph Modjeski.

He was a classmate of Ignacy Jan Paderewski in Poland and was a formidable pianist in his own right.

The son returned to Europe to study at l'Ecole des Ponts et Chaussées (the School of Bridges and Roads) in Paris, France. It was in 1883, while studying at Paris, that he obtained American citizenship. However, he always maintained contact with Poland, wrote much in Polish, and emphasized his Polish origins.

In 1885 he graduated from the School of Bridges and Roads at the top of his class. The same year, he married Felicie Benda; the couple had three children. In 1931 they divorced after 16 year long separation. The same year the now 70 year old Modjeski married Virginia Mary Giblyn. 

Modjeski returned to America to begin his career, working first under the "father of American bridge-building," George S. Morison. In 1893, in Chicago, Modjeski opened his own design office, which still exists as "Modjeski & Masters," after it was joined in 1924 by Frank M. Masters.

Modjeski's first project as chief engineer was the railroad bridge across the Mississippi River at Rock Island, Illinois. During his career, he served as chief or consulting engineer on dozens of bridges around the country.

He took over the mis-designed Quebec Bridge after the 1907 disaster that killed 75 workers, and succeeded in creating the longest truss span in the world (though a construction accident killed another thirteen workers). It is still the longest cantilever bridge in the world.

Modjeski was famous as a designer of bridges and rail lines. He pioneered suspension bridges. He built nearly 40 bridges spanning the great rivers of North America. He trained succeeding generations of American bridge designers and builders, including Joseph B. Strauss, chief engineer of San Francisco's Golden Gate Bridge (which was completed six months after Modjeski's San Francisco–Oakland Bay Bridge).

Modjeski was considered "America's greatest bridge builder." He was the recipient of numerous awards and honorary degrees. In 1911 he received a doctorate in engineering from Illinois State University, in 1923 the Franklin Medal, in 1929 a doctorate honoris causa from the Lwów Polytechnic, in 1930 the prestigious John Fritz Medal.

He died June 26, 1940, in Los Angeles, California, nearly 80 years old.

Notable projects

Chief Engineer
Government Bridge (1896)
Thebes Bridge (1905)
Burlington Northern Railroad Bridge 9.6, Bridge 8.8 and Bridge 5.1 (all 1906–08)
Quebec Bridge (1907-1917)
McKinley Bridge (1910)
Celilo Bridge (1910)
Crooked River Railroad Bridge (1911)
Broadway Bridge (Portland, Oregon)  (1913)
Metropolis Bridge (1914)
Harahan Bridge (1916)
Metropolis Bridge (1917)
Mears Memorial Bridge (1923)
Mid-Hudson Bridge aka Franklin Delano Roosevelt Mid-Hudson Bridge (1930)
Benjamin Franklin Bridge (Philadelphia, Pennsylvania and Camden, New Jersey (1926)
Tacony-Palmyra Bridge (Philadelphia, Pennsylvania and Palmyra, New Jersey) (1929)
I-74 Bridge aka the Moline to Bettendorf Veterans Memorial Bridge 1933
Huey P. Long Bridge (1935)
Blue Water Bridge (Port Huron, Michigan and Point Edward, Ontario, 1938)
Consulting Engineer
Manhattan Bridge (1909)
Market Street Bridge (Harrisburg, Pennsylvania) (1926)
Ambassador Bridge (Detroit, Michigan, and Windsor, Ontario, 1929)
George Rogers Clark Memorial Bridge (1929)
McPhaul Suspension Bridge (1929)
San Francisco–Oakland Bay Bridge (1936)

See also
List of Poles

Notes

References

External links
 BRIDGING URBAN AMERICA, A STORY OF RALPH MODJESKI, a documentary film
 Ralph Modjeski on the ASCE History and Heritage of Civil Engineering website
 
Cultural Heritage site, includes a brief resume
 
 

1861 births
1940 deaths
People from Bochnia
Polish emigrants to the United States
Polish engineers
American civil engineers
Bridge engineers
Illinois State University alumni
Howard N. Potts Medal recipients
John Fritz Medal recipients